Pollia is a genus of flowering plants in the family Commelinaceae, first described in 1781. It is widespread through the Old World Tropics: Africa, southern Asia, northern Australia, etc. There is also one species endemic to Panama.

 Species
 Pollia americana Faden - Panama
 Pollia bracteata K.Schum. - Tanzania
 Pollia condensata C.B.Clarke - much of tropical Africa
 Pollia crispata (R.Br.) Benth. - Queensland, New South Wales
 Pollia gracilis C.B.Clarke - Comoros, Madagascar
 Pollia hasskarlii R.S.Rao - southern China, Himalayas, Indochina, Peninsular Malaysia, Java
 Pollia × horsfieldii C.B.Clarke - Java    (P. secundiflora × P. thyrsiflora)
 Pollia japonica Thunb. - China, Japan, Korea, Taiwan, Vietnam
 Pollia macrobracteata D.Y.Hong - Guangxi
 Pollia macrophylla (R.Br.) Benth. - Queensland, New Guinea, Solomon Islands, Philippines, Vietnam
 Pollia mannii C.B.Clarke - from Ivory Coast to Tanzania + Angola
 Pollia miranda (H.Lév.) H.Hara - China, Japan, Ryukyu Islands, Taiwan
 Pollia papuana Ridl. - New Guinea
 Pollia pentasperma C.B.Clarke - Assam
 Pollia sambiranensis H.Perrier - Madagascar
 Pollia secundiflora (Blume) Bakh.f. - China, Taiwan, Ryukyu Islands, Indian Subcontinent, Southeast Asia, New Guinea, New Caledonia
 Pollia subumbellata C.B.Clarke - southern China, Himalayas, Peninsular Malaysia
 Pollia sumatrana Hassk. - Peninsular Malaysia, Borneo, Sumatra, Philippines
 Pollia thyrsiflora (Blume) Steud. - southern China, Assam, Southeast Asia
 Pollia verticillata Hallier f. - New Guinea
 Pollia × zollingeri (Hassk.) C.B.Clarke - Java   (P. hasskarlii × P. secundiflora)

References

Commelinaceae
Commelinales genera